Tokushima Prefectural Joto High School (徳島県立城東高等学校, Tokushima Kenritsu Jōtō Kōtō Gakkō) is a secondary school in Tokushima, Tokushima, Japan, founded in 1902. It is one of the top high schools in Tokushima Prefecture. Approximately 1,100 students attend the school.

The school is operated by the Tokushima Prefectural Board of Education. In 2004, the school replaced its old school building with a newer facility.

In 2014, Joto High School was designated as a Super Global High School (スーパーグローバルハイスクール) by the Ministry of Education, Culture, Sports, Science and Technology (MEXT). Joto is one of 56 schools across Japan to participate in the program, which aims to encourage students to become global leaders.

Notable alumni
Jakucho Setouchi
Keiko Takemiya

Surrounding area
Tokushima Shimbun Headquarters
Shikoku Broadcasting
Route 11
Tokushima District Public Prosecutors Office
Roman Catholic Church
Tokushimahoncho Intersection
Tokushima District Court
Tokushima Central Park
Tokushima Station

External links
Tokushima Prefectural Joto High School (Japanese version only)

High schools in Tokushima Prefecture
Educational institutions established in 1902
Schools in Tokushima Prefecture
1902 establishments in Japan